Rail terminology is a form of technical terminology. The difference between the American term railroad and the international term railway (used by the International Union of Railways and English-speaking countries outside the United States) is the most significant difference in rail terminology. These and other terms have often originated from the parallel development of rail transport systems in different parts of the world. In English-speaking countries outside the United Kingdom, a mixture of US and UK terms may exist.

Various global terms are presented here. Where a term has multiple names, this is indicated. The abbreviation "UIC" refers to standard terms adopted by the International Union of Railways in its official publications and thesaurus.

0–9

A

B

C

D

E

F

G

H 

 Harmonic rock or harmonic rock and roll
 The condition of locomotives and cars swaying in opposite directions when traversing depressions on the roadbed. A potentially dangerous condition that can cause coupler damage, lading damage, or derailments at slower speeds.
 Head-End Power
 A scheme whereby the locomotive engine or a separate generator provides hotel power to carriages
 Headboard
 A sign attached to a locomotive to identify a named train or charter, or for other special occasions
 Headstock
 A transverse structural member located at the extreme end of a rail vehicle's underframe. The headstock supports the coupling at that end of the vehicle, and may also support buffers, in which case it may also be known as a "buffer beam".
 Heavy haul
 Heavy freight operations
 High rail
 The upper rail in a curve or superelevation, which typically experiences higher lateral loads and greater wear
 Hole
 A passing siding. Inferior trains "lay over in the hole" to let superior ones pass.
 Home signal
 See absolute signal.
 Horn blocks
 Plates lining the axlebox cut-outs in a locomotive frame to allow smooth vertical movement under control of the springs
 Hostling
 The action of shuttling a locomotive from the yard to the engine house or vice versa
 Hotbox
 An axle bearing that has become excessively hot due to friction
 Hotbox detector
 A device attached to the track that monitors passing trains for hot axles, and reports results via radio transmission (typical in the US) or a circuit to the signal box (typical in the UK). See defect detector.
 Hudson type
 A steam locomotive with a 4-6-4 wheel arrangement
 Hump
 A raised section in a rail sorting yard that allows operators to use gravity to move freight railcars into the proper position within the yard when making up trains of cars. This is faster and requires less effort than moving cars with a switching engine.
 Hunting
 Swaying motion of a railway vehicle or bogie caused by the coning action on which the directional stability of an adhesion railway depends. The truck or bogie wanders from side to side between the rails, "hunting" for the optimum location based on the forces at play.

I 
 Independent brake or locomotive brake
 The braking system that applies or releases the brakes of a locomotive independently from its train
 Infill station or in-fill station
 A train station built on an existing passenger line to address demand in a location between existing stations
 Injector
 A device to force water into a steam locomotive's boiler by steam pressure
 Insulated rail joint (IRJ) or insulated block joint (IBJ)
 Rail joints incorporating insulation to isolate individual track circuits
 Interchange
 Any track or yard where rail cars are transferred from one carrier to another
 Interlocking
 An arrangement of switches and signals interconnected in a way that each movement follows the other in a proper and safe sequence
 Intermodal freight transport
 Moving goods by more than one type of vehicle, often achieved using shipping containers that are transferred among railroad flatcars, ships, airplanes, and tractor-trailer trucks
 Intermodal passenger transport
 Moving people by more than one type of vehicle
 Interoperability
 Ability of a transport network to operate trains and infrastructures to provide, accept and use services so exchanged without any substantial change in functionality or performance
 Island platform
 A railway platform that has tracks along the full lengths of both sides

J 

 Jacobs Bogie
 A Bogie, or truck (American), shared between two pieces of rolling stock.  Cars joined with Jacobs bogies are semi-permanently joined in an articulated configuration.  A weight-saving feature used on lightweight passenger trains.
 Joint bar or rail joiner
 A metal plate that joins the ends of rails in jointed track
 Jointed track
 Track in which the rails are laid in lengths of around 20 m and bolted to each other end-to-end by means of fishplates or joint bars
 Journal bearing
 A bearing without rolling elements; a plain bearing
 Journal box
 The housing of a journal bearing. See also Axlebox above.
 Jubilee type
 A steam locomotive with a 4-4-4 wheel arrangement
 Junction
 A point at which two lines or separate routes diverge from each other

K 
 Keeper
 A padlock or hook securing the lever of a hand-operated switch, thereby preventing the switch points from moving as rolling stock passes over them
 Kick
 To shove a car a short distance and uncouple it in motion, allowing it to roll free under gravity and/or its own inertia onto a track. Commonly practiced in bowl or hump yards to make up or break down trains or classify large numbers of cars in an expedient fashion. Differs from a flying switch in that the locomotive is pushing the car rather than pulling it when the cut is made.
 Kicker
 A freight car with a defect in its brake valve that causes the entire train's brake system to go into emergency when any application is made
 Kinematic envelope (KE)
 The outline of the space beside and above the track that must be kept clear of obstructions for the train to pass. This can be larger than the static clearance around an unmoving engine or car. See also: loading gauge and structure gauge
 Knuckle
 The articulating part of a coupler that locks automatically in its closed position to join rail cars; so named because its movement resembles that of the human finger

L 
 Lead track
 A non-main track from which several others branch within a short distance, such as within a rail yard or engine terminal
 Level crossing (LC), railroad crossing, railway crossing, train crossing, or grade crossing
 A crossing on one level ("at-grade intersection")—without recourse to a bridge or tunnel—generally of a railway line by a road or path. Not to be confused with non-dead-end railways (see Rail crossing)
 Light engine
 A locomotive travelling on its own, or perhaps with just a caboose (brake van) attached
 Light rail
 A city-based rail system based on tram design standards that operates mostly in private rights-of-way separated from other traffic but sometimes, if necessary, mixed with other traffic in city streets. Light rail vehicles (LRVs) generally have a top speed of around  though mostly operating at much lower speeds, more akin to road vehicles. Light rail vehicles usually run on trackage that weighs less per foot (due to a smaller track profile) than the tracks used for main-line freight trains; thus they are "light rail" due to the smaller rails usually used.
 Link and pin
 An obsolete method of coupling rail cars, consisting of manually dropping the coupling pin into the drawbar as the cars joined. Extremely hazardous to the brakemen of its day, it was outlawed in the United States by the Railroad Safety Appliance Act of 1893.
 Local train
 A train that stops at most, if not all, stations along its route
 Lunar
 An off-white color of railway signal light, like the Moon, achieved by the use of a clear lens of very light blue, to make it distinct from a light that has a broken lens.

M 
 Maglev
 A system of high speed train transportation that uses two sets of magnets: one set to repel and push the train up off the track, and another set to move the elevated train ahead, taking advantage of the lack of friction.
 Main generator
 The electric generator in a diesel-electric locomotive that is coupled directly to the prime mover and feeds electrical energy to the traction motors
 Main reservoir
 The compressed-air tank of a locomotive containing source air for the brakes and other pneumatic appliances
 Mallet
 A type of articulated locomotive designed by the Swiss mechanical engineer Anatole Mallet (pronounced "mallay"). See Compound engine.
 Manifest
 An express freight train carrying a variety of general merchandise
 Mars Light
 A nose-mounted mechanically oscillated light used to warn traffic of an approaching locomotive.  Functionally replaced by ditch lights on modern locomotives.
 Mechanical semaphore signal
 A signal in which the aspect is conveyed by moving an arm
 Meet
 In rail transport operations, a meet occurs when two trains arrive at a location and pass each other on parallel tracks, such as on a siding, usually in opposing directions. This is also sometimes referred to as a crossing of two trains.
 Mikado type
 A steam locomotive with a 2-8-2 wheel arrangement
 
In the U.S., milk trains ran from the countryside to cities making numerous stops at minor depots to pick up cans of fresh milk, making them a colloquial expression for a very slow train.  
 In the U. K., an aggregator for transporting milk from farms to dairies, such as British Railways Milk Trains; as these trains invariably ran very early in the morning, "milk train" became a colloquialism for a particularly early train.
 Modalohr
 An inter-modal car
 Mogul type
 A steam locomotive with a 2-6-0 wheel arrangement
 Mothballed
 A track that is still serviceable but no trains are running on them.
 Mountain type
 A steam locomotive with a 4-8-2 wheel arrangement
 Mud ring
 The bottom of the water space surrounding a steam locomotive's firebox that collects solids precipitating from the water supply during the boiling process
 Multiple aspect signalling
 A system of colour-light signalling in which signals may show three or four aspects
 Multiple unit (MU)
 A self-propelled rail vehicle that can be joined with compatible others and controlled from a single driving station. The sub-classes of this type of vehicle; Diesel Multiple Unit (DMU), Diesel-Electric Multiple Unit (DEMU) and Electric Multiple Unit (EMU) are more common terms. These may also be termed railcars.

N 

 Narrow gauge
 Northern type
 A steam locomotive with a 4-8-4 wheel arrangement, also known in North America as "Pocono", "Niagara", "Confederation", "Greenbrier", and "Potomac"
  or run 8
 The eighth notch of a locomotive throttle control, indicating full power

O 
 Open wagon (UIC)
 A form of freight hauling car for bulk goods
 Out to foul
 When equipment is placed ahead of the fouling point of a switch turnout

P 
 
 Pacific type
 A steam locomotive with a 4-6-2 wheel arrangement
 Pannier tank
 A tank locomotive where the water tanks are mounted on the boiler in pannier-like fashion
 Pantograph
 An apparatus mounted on the roof of a rail vehicle to allow the collection of electric current from overhead lines
 Paperwork
 As a reason for delays, written instructions conveyed to a train's engineer in which the train must proceed slower than its normal speed. These instructions are either handed to the crew or recited and read back over radio.
 Pennsy
 Abbreviation for the former Pennsylvania Railroad
 Per diem (pronounced by some U.S. railroaders per die-um, not per dee-um)
 A fee paid by a rail company to the owner of a car (or wagon) for the time it spends on the company's property
 An authorized living expense payment for some workers forced away from their home terminal
 Permissive signal
 A block signal whose most restrictive indication is stop and proceed. A permissive signal is identified by the presence of a number plate affixed to the mast or supporting structure. Proceeding beyond a permissive signal at stop is allowed at restricted speed if operating conditions enable a train operator to stop before reaching any train or obstruction.
 Pilot
 A deflective shield affixed to the front of a locomotive to protect its wheels from on-track debris; archaically called a "cowcatcher" See also: Pilot (locomotive)
 An employee qualified on the operating rules and physical characteristics of a certain section of the railroad, assisting a crew member who is not so qualified See also: Railroad engineer
 Pilot engine
 The leading locomotive during a double-heading operation
 An unattached locomotive driven a specified distance in front of a special train
 Pilot man
 Where it is necessary to temporarily work a section of line as single track (for instance if the other track of a double-track line is out of use), a person (the pilot man) acts as the single track token.
 Piston
 The moving component in the cylinder of a steam engine or internal combustion engine that translates into motion the force exerted by pressurised steam or quickly-burning fuel
 Piston travel
 A specified distance that a brake piston may move from its cylinder to the brake rigging. If the travel exceeds or falls short of this distance, the equipment must be set out for repair.
 Platform screen doors
 Infrastructure used to separate the platform from train tracks.
 Pony truck
 A two-wheel truck or bogie at the front of a locomotive
 Porch
 The extended walkway at either end of a U.S. locomotive
 Porter
 An employee who performs or performed (the role has now largely become obsolete) various physical duties, chiefly but not exclusively involving lifting. Various types of porter include:
 A baggage porter assisting with luggage
 An operating porter assisting with safeworking duties
 A station porter assisting with general station duties
 A lad porter being a junior station porter
 Portion working
 The practice of coupling two or more passenger trains together over common sections of their respective routes, but otherwise operating the trains separately
 Position light signal
 A block signal in which the relative position of the lights determines the meaning
 Positive train control (PTC)
 A system of functional requirements for monitoring and controlling train movements with the aim of increasing operational safety
 Possession
 A period of time when one or more tracks are closed for maintenance. For the duration of the work, a person in charge of possession (PICOP) has control of the line. When work is complete the possession is relinquished and control of the line handed back to the signaller.
 Pound
 The weight (and thus the cross section) of a length of rail. A heavier rail can carry heavier loads with less distortion and less damage to the rails themselves and the roadbed.
 Power
 A locomotive or group of connected (MU'd) locomotives serving as the motive power for a train
 Power braking
 Pulling against the train brakes at the higher end of the locomotive's power output (e.g. notches five through eight on a conventional throttle). This is considered wasteful of fuel and brake shoes, and is therefore discouraged by most operating departments.
 Prairie type
 A steam locomotive with a 2-6-2 wheel arrangement
 Prime mover
 The internal combustion engine of a diesel locomotive
 Pull apart
 A rail broken from cold-related contraction
 Push pole
The two ends of the poles were placed in receptacles called push pole pockets. The practice of using a push pole for switching was called "poling".
 Push–pull train
 A configuration for locomotive-hauled trains, allowing them to be driven from either end of the train, whether having a locomotive at each end or not. See also: Auto train. See Top and tail for train with locomotives at both front and back.

R 
 Rack railway, rack-and-pinion railway, or cog railway
 A steep-grade railway with a toothed rack rail (usually between the running rails), used when adhesion is insufficient
 Railbus
 A passenger rail vehicle (typically non-articulated or rigid frame) that derived from bus propulsion and construction technology, but may evolve into larger dimensions, performance, and characteristics similar in appearance to a light DMU railcar
 Railcar
 A powered single unit or articulated passenger car, usually "railroad-derived" light DMU or EMU, with a driver's cab at one or both ends
 Rail crossing
 The opposite of a dead-end rail, i.e. a line connecting locations accessed by other railways, often associated with the overcoming of natural obstacles, such as mountain ranges. Not to be confused with a railway crossing a road (see Level crossing)
 Railfan
 A hobbyist or enthusiast of trains
 Rail grinder
 A machine used to remove irregularities in the surface of the rails that may be self-powered or part of a consist
 Rail profile
 The cross section shape of rail. There are many rail profiles, often specific to individual railroads. Rails must be periodically scanned electronically, the data inspected and analysed, then re-profiled with rail grinding machines to maintain the safe and proper rail profile. Rails that cannot be brought back to the proper rail profile are condemned and replaced.
 Rail squeal
 A screeching train-track friction sound, most commonly occurring on sharp curves or heavy braking
 Rail tractor
 A small petrol (gas) or diesel shunting (switcher) locomotive
 Railroad car
 Any railroad vehicle other than a locomotive
 Railroadiana
 Artifacts of railways around the world
 , railroad line, rail line, or train line
 A railway route connecting two or more places or other railway routes
 A railway route constructed by an organization, usually one formed for that purpose
 A railway route that has an official name (notably bestowed by engineers line references in the UK)
 A set of railway routes that are bundled for publicity purposes (e.g. a UK train operating company)
 Railway station
 A train station, a stopping point for trains, usually with passenger access
 Railway terminal
 A building for passengers at the end of a railway line
 Red
 A colour generally associated with stop, when shown by signals or flags
 Red zone
 The area between, under, or within a few feet of cars and locomotives. To enter the zone, a ground employee must obtain protection from the locomotive engineer (if a locomotive is coupled) or a blue signal (if no locomotive is coupled).
 Reefer
 A refrigerated railcar, used to transport perishable goods
 
 A siding used as a passing place on a main line, where slow trains may be held whilst an express passes—a simpler, but less convenient, form of the passing loop
 Reporting mark
 A two- to four-letter code, assigned by the Association of American Railroads, that is applied to equipment operating on North American railroads to identify the owner
 Rerail frog or rerailer
 A metal casting slotted over the rail near the wheel of a derailed train car. The engine then pushes or pulls the car so that the derailed wheel runs up the rerailer and back onto the track.
 Retarder
 A device installed in a classification yard used to reduce the speed of freight cars as they are sorted into consists
 Reverser or reverser handle
 The handle that controls the directional control on a locomotive. See also Cut off.
 Ribbon rail
 Continuously welded rail
 Right-side failure
 A failure in a signalling or other safety critical system that leaves the system in a safe condition
 Roadrailer
 A highway trailer, or semi-trailer, that is specially equipped for direct use on a railroad
 Rolling stock
 In UK parlance, any railway vehicle that is not capable of moving under its own power
 In US parlance, any railroad car or locomotive
 Rookie
 See Trainee.
 Rotary
 Short for rotary snowplow, an extreme-duty railroad snowplow used mainly in the mountain ranges of the American West
  Roundhouse
 A circular or semi-circular structure used for storage and running maintenance of locomotives
 , punch box, or train-identification pushbuttons (New York City Subway)
 A box or panel adjacent to a rail line at an interlocking, with several buttons for train operators to select a desired route, which is then either communicated to a signal tower where an operator fulfills the request, or switched automatically
 Ruling gradient
 The longest or steepest grade on a division, thus setting the standard for track speeds, locomotive tonnage ratings, and train handling instructions
 Run
 The action verb for the train's movement.  The train runs across the track.  
 Runaway
 A heavy train that has lost speed control while descending a steep grade, due to either brake failure or poor preparation by the crew
 Running track
 An other-than-main track, typically providing access to a yard or industry and governed by the requirements of restricted speed
 Run-round
 The practice of detaching a locomotive from its train, driving it to the other end of the train and re-attaching it, to allow the train to proceed in the direction it has just come from (e.g. when it reaches its destination and forms a service in the other direction).
 Run-through power
 Locomotives that remain attached to a manifest or unit train from their home rails over the tracks of a receiving railroad until the train reaches its final destination

S 
 Saddle tank
 A tank locomotive with the water tank mounted on top of the boiler like a saddle
 Safe place
 An area within the network of an operator where evacuation of passengers can be performed, depending on current operational conditions, with a minimum of risk to the passengers (e.g. stations, refuges on the line)
 Safeworking
 The system of rules and equipment designed to ensure the safe operation of trains
 Sandbox
 A container on locomotives and self-propelled multiple units, or trams, that run on tramways and adhesion railways. The container holds sand, which a crew can drop onto the rail to improve rail adhesion under wet, steep, or slippery rail conditions. The sandbox and operating mechanism are collectively known as sanding gear.
 Sandite
 Consists of a mixture of sand, aluminium, and a unique type of adhesive, used instead of plain sand for extreme slippery rail conditions
 Santa Fe type
 A steam locomotive with a 2-10-2 wheel arrangement, named for the Atchison, Topeka and Santa Fe Railway—the first railroad to use such a configuration
 Saturated locomotive
 A steam locomotive not equipped with a superheater; the steam thus remains at the same temperature as the water in the boiler
 Scale
 Solid debris distilled from boiling water in a steam locomotive. To prevent corrosion damage from scale build-up, the locomotive must undergo a boiler wash once each operating month.
 Schnabel car
 A specialized type of freight car for extra heavy and oversized loads where the car is loaded in such a way that the load forms part of the car superstructure
 Searchlight
 A signal with a single light source usually capable of displaying three different colors. An internal mechanism governs the color displayed.
 Section
 A portion of a train that may be operated independently or combined with other sections to operate as a single unit
 A portion of railway line designated for signalling or maintenance
 An interior portion of a sleeping car made up of two double seats during daytime that convert to two double berths during nighttime
 Semaphore signal
 A type of signal that has a moving arm to change the indication
 Shay locomotive
 A type of geared steam locomotive built to the patents of Ephraim Shay
 Shunt
 In UK and Australian parlance, to make up and divide trains in sidings, to move trains to or from sidings, or to move trains between platforms in a station
 Shoofly
Temporary track used to avoid an obstacle that blocks movement on the normal track section
 Shuttle train
 A train, usually a passenger service, that runs back and forth, usually over a relatively short distance, such as between a junction station and a branch-line terminus.
 Side tank
 A tank locomotive with water tanks mounted each side of the boiler
 Siding
 A section of track off the main line. Sidings are often used for storing rolling stock or freight. A siding is also used as a form of rail access for warehouses and other businesses, where the siding often meets up with loading docks at rail car height. In the U.S. the term also covers the British term loop. Also, a passing track in the U.S.
 Signal
 A device that indicates the condition of the line ahead to the driver of a train
 Signal box
 A building or room that houses signal levers (usually in a frame), a control panel or a VDU-based control system
 Signal passed at danger
 An event in which a train passes a signal to stop without authorization to do so
 Signalman
 A person in charge of the signalling at a station or junction, often in a signal box
 Slippery rail
 The condition of fallen leaves or other debris lying on and clinging to a railroad track that could cause train wheel slippage, resulting in premature wheel wear and train delays
 Slow order
 A local speed restriction below the track's normal speed limit often designated by yellow and green flags. Slow orders can be imposed on a temporary basis to protect, for example, maintenance of way employees while sections of track are under repair. Widely used in areas where track is substandard and in need of repair.
 Slug
 A locomotive that contains traction motors yet lacks the diesel engine to create its own power, which is instead supplied by a connected mother locomotive
 Smokebox
 An enclosed (normally cylindrical) space attached to the end of the boiler opposite the firebox on a steam locomotive (normally the front). Supports the stack; steam pipes to and from the cylinders pass through here; contains the blastpipe where the exhaust steam is used to provide draft for the fire. In superheated locomotives, also contains the superheater header and (optionally) a front-end throttle.
 Snowplow, snow plow, snowplough, or snow plough
 A rail service vehicle used for snow removal from train tracks
 Snow shed
 A long shelter erected over a railroad track on the side of a mountain to protect the line from avalanches and drifting
 Span bolster
 The beam between two bogies
 Spike
 A bolt, pin, or nail used to hold rails, or plates connected to the rails (known as tie plates), to sleepers (ties)
 Spiral easement
 See Track transition curve. Also known as tangent lead-in.
 Spreader
 Maintenance of way equipment designed to spread or shape ballast profiles, remove snow, clean and dig ditches as well as trim embankments
 Spur line
 A very short branch line may be called a spur line.
 Self-propelled ultrasonic rail testing (SPURT) (India)
 A self-propelled rail-defect detector car
 Staff and ticket
 A method of safeworking involving a token
 Standard gauge
 Station master
 The person in charge of a station
 Steam generator
 A device generally used in passenger trains to create steam for heating. The steam generator is usually in the locomotive but may also be located in other cars.
 Steam reverser
 A reversing gear worked by a steam cylinder controlled from the cab
 Subdivision
 The trackage area within a division covered by a single timetable
 Supercharger
 A mechanical device that boosts the pressure of engine intake air to above atmospheric level, causing an increase in power. Not to be confused with the blower used to scavenge the cylinders of a naturally aspirated two-stroke Diesel engine.
 Superelevation
 Areas on curves where the outside rail is elevated higher than the inside rail, creating a banked curve, generally allowing higher speeds and more comfort for passengers (on passenger trains).
 Superheater
 A device in a steam locomotive that raises the temperature of saturated steam substantially beyond the boiling point of water, increasing power and efficiency
 Survey
 To determine the position of constructed objects, including rail infrastructure, in relation to the earth's surface. This is accomplished by measuring angles and distances based on the principles of triangulation.
 Surveyor
 A person assigned to perform survey work
 Switchback or zig zag
 A method of climbing and descending steep gradients, where shallow-gradient track reverses direction for a while, and then reverses again to continue in the original direction
 Switchman
 A railroad worker responsible for assembling trains and switching railroad cars in a yard

T 
 Tamping machine
 Generally, a locomotive used in track maintenance and equipped with track lifting facilities, and paddles that push ballast beneath a rail track to assure its level and cant
 Tank car
  A type of rolling stock designed to transport liquid and gaseous commodities
 Tank locomotive or Tank engine
 A steam locomotive that carries its water in one or more on-board water tanks rather than in a separate tender. 
 Team track
 A spur or siding for loading freight, often used by firms not having their own direct rail access
 Tender
 A specialized rail car attached to a steam locomotive to carry its fuel and water supplies, along with tools and flagging equipment
 Terminal railroad (or terminal railway)
 A company in the United States that owns no cars of its own and transports only the railroad cars of other companies around a specific terminal station
 Texas type
 A steam locomotive with a 2-10-4 wheel arrangement
 Third rail
 An electrified rail that runs along the tracks, giving power to trains. Used mostly in subways and rapid transit systems.
 Through coach
 A passenger coach that is disconnected from one train and attached to another before continuing on with its journey, thus avoiding the need for passengers themselves to switch trains
 Through platform
 The standard platform and track arrangement at a station. The train pulls alongside the platform, arriving from one end of the station, and may pass out the other end of the station by continuing along the same track
 Tie plate
 A plate bolted to sleepers to hold the rails in place
 Trailer on flat car (TOFC)
 Intermodal freight transport
 Token
 A physical object given to a locomotive driver to authorize use of a particular stretch of single track
 Track bed or trackbed
 The foundation of rail tracks
 Track bulletin
 A form used by railroad employees that shows the locations of slow orders, maintenance of way work locations, and other conditions affecting the track and movement of trains
 Track circuit
 An electrical circuit that detects the presence of locomotives or cars (as their wheelsets electrically bond the rails) in a block of track, and provides real-time input to signaling logic
 Track transition curve
 The gradual application of superelevation and tighter curve radius, calculated with reference to the anticipated line speed and the final curve radius, on the approach to a bend. Also known as the transition spiral and spiral easement.
 Track Warrant Control
 Control of train movements by "track warrants" which are sets of instructions issued to a train crew authorizing specific train movements. 
 Trackside objects
 See Wayobjects.
 Traction current pylon
 Traction motor
 A large electric motor that powers the driving wheels of an electric or diesel-electric locomotive
 Tractive effort
 The pulling or pushing force exerted by a locomotive or other vehicle
 Trailing
 A turnout where both legs merge in the direction of travel—the opposite of facing
 Train bell
 In North American practice, the warning bell on a locomotive or any autonomous railway vehicle 
 Train coupler 
 The mechanical interface that links vehicles so a driver can operate them together. The coupler can be a purely mechanical device such as a screw coupler or bar coupler. Alternatively the coupler can also incorporate electrical or pneumatic connections.
 Train horn
 The warning horn in a locomotive or in a control car
 Trainman
 An employee assigned to train service, such as a conductor, brakeman, or switchman
 Train inauguration
 The automated process of train bus configuration that includes detecting all bus nodes and their orientation, assigning the numbers to particular bus nodes and collecting their properties.
 Train operation and management
 The procedures and related equipment enabling a coherent operation of the different structural subsystem, both during normal and degraded operation, including in particular train driving, traffic planning and management
 , terminal manager, or road manager
 An employee who supervises operations over a given territory
 Train order
 The process whereby signallers or dispatchers can change the order or timing of trains to maximise overall train service performance in real time
 Train set
 A toy train with its tracks, buildings, etc.
 Trainset
 A group of rolling stock that is permanently or semi-permanently coupled together to form a unified set of equipment. Trainsets are most often used in passenger train configurations.
 Tram
 A city-based rail system that typically shares its operational space with other vehicles and often runs on, across, or down the center of city streets
 Tram-train
 Trams that are designed to run both on the tracks of a city-based rail system and on the existing railway networks.
 Treadle 
 A mechanical or electrical device for detecting the presence of a rail vehicle with pin-point accuracy, unlike a track circuit, which provides detection over an arbitrary distances
 Turnout or points
 A switch
 Turntable
 A section of track that rotates to let locomotives and rolling stock turn around or access several engine maintenance sidings in a small area

U 
 Unit train
 A train in which all cars (wagons) carry the same commodity and are shipped from the same origin to the same destination, without being split up or stored en route

V 
 Vactrain
 A proposed design for very-high-speed rail transportation.
 Vacuum brake
 A continuous train brake that is fail-safe in operation. It is powered by a vacuum from the locomotive but the application is actually by atmospheric pressure when the vacuum is released. Now largely superseded by the air brake.
 Valve gear
 The linkage mechanism that operates the valve for a driving cylinder, to alternately admit steam to the cylinder and then exhaust it when the piston's stroke is nearly complete

W

Y

Z

See also 

 Glossary of Australian railway terms
 Glossary of New Zealand railway terms
 Glossary of North American railway terms
 Glossary of United Kingdom railway terms
 Passenger rail terminology

References

Further reading 
 Canadian National Railways: Linguistic Services. Freight Car Inspection & Maintenance: English-French Vocabulary = Surveillance et entretien des wagons: vocabulaire anglais-français. Montréal: Canadian National Railways, 1973. Without ISBN or SBN

External links 

 British Railways compared to American Railroads

 
Locomotive classification systems
Rail transport
Rail technologies
Wikipedia glossaries using description lists